Altynai Omurbekova is the vice-speaker of the parliament of Kyrgyzstan.

References

Living people
Year of birth missing (living people)
Respublika Party of Kyrgyzstan politicians
21st-century Kyrgyzstani women politicians
21st-century Kyrgyzstani politicians
Place of birth missing (living people)